The ringed toadfish (Omegophora armilla) is a species of puffer in the family Tetraodontidae. It has a black ring surrounding its pectoral fins, and an oval-like body covered in small spines.

Distribution, habitat, and feeding 
It lives in seagrass beds, rocky reefs, and sandy bottoms from 1 to 146 meters deep. It is found in the eastern Indian Ocean, around southern Australia. Its prey consists of small, benthic invertebrates, making it a carnivore.

Conservation 
It is sometimes bycatched in Australian fisheries, and its aquatic resources are being harvested, but these factors do not impact it much. It has no specific threats, and its distribution overlaps with marine protected areas, so it has been listed as Least Concern by the IUCN Red List.

Taxonomy 
O. armilla is one of two species in its genus, alongside the bluespotted toadfish (Omegophora cyanopunctata), with which it overlaps.

References 

Tetraodontidae
Marine fish of Southern Australia
ringed toadfish